Liam Mullane Finn (born 24 September 1983) is a New Zealand singer and musician. Born in Melbourne, Australia, he moved to New Zealand as a child. He is the son of musicians Sharon and Neil Finn.

In 2020, he joined his father's band, Crowded House.

Personal life
Finn married his long-term partner Janina Percival in June 2015.

Career

Live shows 

 In 2008 and 2009 Finn opened for Eddie Vedder's solo tour throughout America. Finn also headlined his first North American tour and headed out on the road with The Black Keys in November 2008 in the UK and Europe. At the Dutch Crossing Border Festival he met Yuri Landman and borrowed a drum guitar, which he used on stage in the Netherlands and Germany. Afterwards Landman invented a new instrument for him, a 24-string electric cymbalum called the Tafelberg, which he incorporated at his stage performances.

Finn played at the Melbourne Cricket Ground on 14 March 2009 for Sound Relief, a multi-venue rock music concert in support of relief for the Victorian Bushfire Crisis. The event was held simultaneously with a concert at the Sydney Cricket Ground. All the proceeds from the Melbourne Concert will go to the Red Cross Victorian Bushfire relief. Appearing with Finn in Melbourne were Augie March, Bliss n Eso with Paris Wells, Gabriella Cilmi, Hunters & Collectors, Jack Johnson, Kasey Chambers & Shane Nicholson with Troy Cassar-Daley, Kings of Leon, Jet, Midnight Oil, Paul Kelly, Split Enz and Wolfmother.

In August 2009, Finn performed with a new band called BARB on a small New Zealand tour with a band consisting of Connan Hosford (Connan and the Mockasins), James Milne (Lawrence Arabia), Eliza Jane Barnes, Seamus Ebbs, Jol Mulholland and Wild Bill Rickets. Their album (recorded at Roundhead Studios in Auckland) was released 24 August 2010.

In January 2014, Finn toured New Zealand for the first time since 2011, this time with a new backing band The Salty Women, which consisted of mostly past collaborators including James Milne (Lawrence Arabia), Eliza Jane Barnes, and brother Elroy Finn.

With Neil Finn and Crowded House 

On 29 November 2009, Finn and his father also sang together (along with Pearl Jam, Ben Harper and Eliza-Jane Barnes) at Christchurch's AMI Stadium. They sang "Better Be Home Soon" and the Split Enz classic "I Got You".

On 24 August 2018, Finn released the album Lightsleeper with his father.

In 2021 he appeared on Crowded House's album Dreamers Are Waiting as a core member of the band. The album features several songs cowritten by Liam and Neil Finn, and one song ("Goodnight Everyone") that was written by Liam alone.

Discography

Albums

Studio albums

Live albums 
 Live (in Spaceland) – 22 February 2008, Spaceland Recordings
 Live From The Wiltern – (2008) Yep Roc Records

EPs 

 Second Chance (2007)
 Champagne In Seashells (2009)

With Betchadupa 

betchadupa EP (2000)
3D EP (2001)
The Alphabetchadupa (2002)
Aiming For Your Head (2004)

With BARB 
 Barb, (2010)

With Neil Finn 

 Lightsleeper (2018)

References

External links 

Official website (archived)
Liam Finn Myspace
Liberation Music

1983 births
Living people
New Zealand pop singers
New Zealand rock singers
New Zealand songwriters
Male songwriters
New Zealand expatriates in Australia
New Zealand expatriates in England
New Zealand people of Irish descent
Liam
Musicians from Auckland
21st-century New Zealand male singers
Yep Roc Records artists
People educated at Selwyn College, Auckland